Riding High is a 1950 black-and-white musical racetrack film featuring Bing Crosby and directed by Frank Capra. The songs were performed live during filming instead of the customary lip-synching to studio recordings. The film is a remake of an earlier Capra film with screenwriter Robert Riskin titled Broadway Bill (1934). While the film is generally a light musical comedy, its plot contains an unexpected tragic turn.

Plot
Yale graduate Dan Brooks is expected to marry wealthy boss J.L. Higgins' daughter Margaret and join the family box-making business. He is far more interested in racing a horse he owns named Broadway Bill.

Doing poorly at work, Dan and his groom Whitey leave town to enter Bill in the Imperial Derby, but first must find money for the entry fee. He and old pal Professor Pettigrew each try to con the other out of money and then must sing the Yale school song when they cannot pay the check at a restaurant.

Maggie's younger sister Alice is secretly in love with Dan, so she offers him some money, pawning her belongings. Whitey is beaten up trying to win money in a craps game, and Broadway Bill is carted away because Dan does not pay his feed bill, and Dan is thrown in jail as well.

A rich man makes a bet on Bill as a 100-to-1 shot, leading to false rumors that the horse is a sure winner. The odds drop fast, but gamblers and a crooked jockey try to ensure that their own favorites win the race. Broadway Bill somehow manages to win but collapses at the finish line and suffers a fatal heart attack.

Dan finds comfort in his sadness when he decides to buy and race Broadway Bill II. Dan's enthusiasm persuades Alice and her father to help him.

Cast
Bing Crosby as Dan Brooks
Coleen Gray as Alice Higgins
Charles Bickford as J.L. Higgins
Frances Gifford as Margaret Higgins
William Demarest as Happy
Raymond Walburn as Professor Pettigrew
James Gleason as Racing Secretary
Ward Bond as Lee
Clarence Muse as Whitey
Percy Kilbride as Pop Jones
Harry Davenport as Johnson (final film)
Frankie Darro as Jockey Ted Williams
Douglass Dumbrille as Eddie Howard
Joe Frisco as himself
Irving Bacon as Hamburger man
Charles Lane as Erickson
Margaret Hamilton as Edna
Rand Brooks as Henry Early
Willard Waterman as Arthur Winslow
Marjorie Lord as Mary Winslow
Dub Taylor as Joe
Paul Harvey as Mr. Whitehall
Stanley Andrews as Veterinarian (uncredited)
Oliver Hardy as Gambler at Racetrack (uncredited)

Production
Filmed from March 9 to May 1949, some of the scenes in both Broadway Bill and Riding High were filmed at the Tanforan Racetrack in San Bruno, California. The track burned to the ground in July 1964, just before it was to be demolished.

Release and reception
To raise funds for a sports stadium, Crosby arranged for the world premiere of the film to be held in Front Royal, Virginia on April 1, 1950.

The film's New York premiere took place at the Paramount Theatre on April 10, 1950. The critical response was favorable, and Bosley Crowther of The New York Times called the film "genial and jovial entertainment ... [e]ven though light and familiar, sentimental, and even absurd, ... Bing has a stakes winner in Broadway Bill."
 
Varietys review was favorable: "Big yen by the Hollywood film factories recently for remaking past hits is bound to get another hypo when this one gets around. Frank Capra has taken Mark Hellinger’s yarn, Broadway Bill, which he produced and directed for Columbia in 1934, and turned it into one of the best Bing Crosby starrers that’s come along for a considerable time."

A positive review was published in Photoplay: "Just when folk were wondering when Bing Crosby’s lean season was due to end, along comes Frank Capra with a tailor-made story worthy of Bing's considerable talents... Full of high spirits, as fresh as a newly-cut sward, and deliciously humorous, this is without question the best Crosby film for years."

Harrison's Reports called the film "as good and even better than the original, for the leading role is a 'natural' for Bing Crosby, whose easy-going style and nonchalant glibness give the picture much of its charm."

John McCarten of The New Yorker also liked the film, writing: "Besides including interesting stuff about racing, 'Riding High' offers several pleasant songs, rendered genially by Mr. Crosby."

Soundtrack
"A Sure Thing" (Jimmy Van Heusen / Johnny Burke): sung by Bing Crosby
"Someplace on Anywhere Road" (Jimmy Van Heusen / Johnny Burke): sung by Bing Crosby and Clarence Muse
"The Whiffenpoof Song": sung by Bing Crosby, Raymond Walburn, William Demarest and group
"Sunshine Cake" (Jimmy Van Heusen / Johnny Burke): sung by Bing Crosby, Clarence Muse and Coleen Gray
"The Horse Told Me" (Jimmy Van Heusen / Johnny Burke): sung by Bing Crosby and group
"Camptown Races": sung by Bing Crosby, Coleen Gray, Clarence Muse and children

Crosby recorded four of the songs for Decca Records. His songs were also included in the Bing's Hollywood series.

See also
 List of American films of 1950

References

External links

1950 films
1950 musical comedy films
Remakes of American films
American musical comedy films
American black-and-white films
Films scored by Victor Young
Films directed by Frank Capra
American horse racing films
Paramount Pictures films
Films with screenplays by Robert Riskin
1950s English-language films
1950s American films